Malleval may refer to two communes in France:

 Malleval was until 2005 the name of Malleval-en-Vercors, in the Isère department
 Malleval, Loire